DeJuan Lytelle Jones (born June 24, 1997) is an American professional soccer player who plays as a defender for Major League Soccer club New England Revolution.

Early life
Prior to playing collegiately at Michigan State University, Jones was a four-year letter winner in soccer at East Lansing High School. During his junior and senior seasons he led the Trojans to a combined 50–4 record en route to winning back-to-back State Championships. Throughout the seven game playoff run his senior season, Jones netted 9 goals and tailed 12 assists which included the game tying assist and game winning overtime goal in the 2014 State Championship against Cranbrook Schools Jones was named both the Gatorade Player of the Year and Mr. Soccer for the state of Michigan in his senior year while attending East Lansing High School

College career
Jones played for four seasons at Michigan State, and was captain of the Spartans team that reached the semifinals of the 2018 College Cup. He was named to the second team in the Big Ten Conference, alongside future Revolution teammate Justin Rennicks, and started all 23 of their games in 2018, tallying 5 goals and 5 assists. He scored 7 goals and had 6 assists the season prior, as a junior, and was named to the second team in the Big Ten that season as well. Jones performed well at the MLS Combine ahead of the 2019 MLS SuperDraft, placing first in the combine's speed and agility tests, and third in the vertical jump. After scoring a goal in a scrimmage that day, his draft stock rose from being picked late in the first round, to as high as sixth overall on multiple mock drafts.

Club career

New England Revolution
Jones was selected with the 11th overall pick of the 2019 MLS SuperDraft by the New England Revolution, the club's second selection of the draft, after Tajon Buchanan. After playing a full preseason with the Revolution, Jones signed a contract with the club on February 25, five days ahead of their season opening fixture. Named in the match-day squad for the first two games, Jones did not make his debut until the Revolution's fourth game, at home to expansion side FC Cincinnati on March 24. Jones replaced left-back Edgar Castillo towards the end of the match as the Revolution tried to overcome a two-goal deficit, the game finishing 2–0. On March 30, 2019 Jones made his first career start for the Revolution. He recorded two shots, including one shot on goal and the game winning assist en route to a 2–1 victory over Minnesota. He currently is second on the team in assists for the 2019 season.

Personal life
DeJuan Lytelle Jones was born on June 24, 1997 at Sparrow Hospital in Lansing, Michigan. Jones attended Dwight Rich School of the Arts, located in Lansing, Michigan, from kindergarten through sixth grade. After finishing sixth grade, he transferred to MacDonald Middle School located in East Lansing and was there for seventh and eighth grade and moved on the East Lansing High School which is where he graduated after completing ninth through twelfth grade. After graduating from East Lansing High School he accepted a scholarship to attend Michigan State University to continue his academic and athletic career.

Career statistics

Club

International

References

External links
 Profile at Revolution Official Site
 Profile at Michigan State

1997 births
Living people
Association football midfielders
Michigan State Spartans men's soccer players
Myrtle Beach Mutiny players
New England Revolution players
New England Revolution draft picks
Sportspeople from Lansing, Michigan
Soccer players from Michigan
American soccer players
African-American soccer players
Major League Soccer players
USL League Two players
21st-century African-American sportspeople
United States men's international soccer players